Barmbrack, also often shortened to brack, is a yeast bread with added sultanas and raisins. The bread is associated with Halloween in Ireland, where an item (often a ring) is placed inside the bread, with the person receiving it considered to be fortunate.

Etymology 
It is sometimes called , and the term is also used as two words in its more common version. This may be from the Irish word  -  - and  -  (due to the raisins in it), hence it literally means a speckled loaf (a similar etymology to the Welsh ).

Other origins for "barm" could relate to the use of the froth from fermented ale, which is a form of yeast referred to as barm. This was used in place of bicarbonate soda in baking, as it was not widely available in Ireland until the early 19th century.

Description 
Usually sold in flattened rounds, it is often served toasted with butter along with a cup of tea. The dough is sweeter than sandwich bread, but not as rich as cake, and the sultanas and raisins add flavour and texture to the final product. In most recipes, the dried fruit is soaked overnight in cold tea or whiskey.

Halloween tradition

Barmbrack is the centre of an Irish Halloween custom. These loaves could be decorated on the top with animals or birds. The Halloween Brack traditionally contained various objects baked into the bread and was used as a sort of fortune-telling game. In the brack were: a pea, a stick, a piece of cloth, a small coin (originally a silver sixpence), a ring, and a bean. Each item, when received in the slice, was supposed to carry a meaning to the person concerned: the pea, the person would not marry that year; the stick, would have an unhappy marriage or continually be in disputes; the cloth or rag, would have bad luck or be poor; the coin, would enjoy good fortune or be rich; the ring, would be wed within the year; and the bean, would have a future without money. Other articles added to the brack include a medallion, usually of the Virgin Mary to symbolise taken a religious vocation, although this tradition is not widely continued in the present day.

Commercially produced barmbracks have been sold in Ireland since the late 19th century. In modern times those sold for the Halloween market still include a toy ring, but due to health and safety regulations, they do not contain the other items traditionally included.

New Year's Eve tradition
In many areas of Ireland, it was traditional to bake a large barmbrack on New Year's Eve by the woman of the house. As nightfall approached, three bites would be taken out of the cake by the man of the house and thrown against the front door while invoking the Holy Spirit. This was to ward off poverty or starvation. After an invocation, the family would gather and eat the fragments of cake. In a variant of this tradition from west County Limerick, the door was struck three times with the cake with a different recitation.

Other references
Barmbracks were mentioned in the Van Morrison song "A Sense of Wonder":

Reference to barmbracks is made in Dubliners by James Joyce. The following example can be found in the first paragraph of Joyce's short story  "Clay":

See also

 List of breads
 List of Irish dishes
 Bara Brith

References

External links

Hallowe'en Barmbrack

Yeast breads
Irish breads
Irish cuisine
Sweet breads
Halloween food